Universal Express Pass is a priority status boarding system used at various Universal Destinations & Experiences: Universal Orlando (which encompasses Universal Studios Florida and Universal's Islands of Adventure), Universal Studios Japan, Universal Studios Singapore, and Universal Studios Hollywood.

Universal Express Pass – commonly referred to as Universal Express on park signage, and as Express Pass by team members and guests – admits users to a separate line for the attraction, which is given priority status when boarding. Universal Express Pass is not a virtual queuing service, where users receive a specific time to return to the priority line. Instead, guests who have purchased (or otherwise received) the pass may enter the "Universal Express" line for a considerably shortened queueing time. Depending on the park and the pass options chosen, the pass may be valid any time during the day, or during a specific timeslot for each ride, may be valid for some or all rides, and may give one use or unlimited use of the included rides.

Universal's Express Pass is not included in park admission. There are a limited number of passes available each day and they are often sold out in advance. The cost of the pass varies based on what parks are selected and even what day is selected, with higher prices charged on peak operating days during the year.

Guests at three of Universal Orlando's on-site resorts — the Hard Rock Hotel, the Royal Pacific Resort, and the Portofino Bay Hotel — get complimentary unlimited use of the faster lines during their stay. Guests who hold Universal Orlando's Premier Annual Pass can use it once per day on every participating ride after 4 pm.

Universal Studios Hollywood
Main Entrance Plaza
 Waterworld: A Live Sea War Spectacular

Upper Lot
 The Secret Life of Pets: Off the Leash
 DreamWorks Theatre

Gru's Neighborhood
 Despicable Me Minion Mayhem

Super Silly Fun Land
 Silly Swirly

Springfield, U.S.A.
 The Simpsons Ride

Studio Tour
 King Kong: 360 3-D
 Earthquake: The Big One
 Jaws Encounter
 Jupiter's Claim
 Fast & Furious: Supercharged

The Wizarding World of Harry Potter
 Harry Potter and the Forbidden Journey
 Flight of the Hippogriff

Lower Lot
 Jurassic World: The Ride
 Revenge of the Mummy
 Transformers: The Ride 3D

Universal Orlando Resort

Universal Studios Florida

 Minion Land on Illumination Ave
 Despicable Me Minion Mayhem

Production Central
 Transformers: The Ride 3D
 Hollywood Rip Ride Rockit

KidZone
 E.T. Adventure

New York
 Revenge of the Mummy
 Race Through New York Starring Jimmy Fallon

San Francisco
 Fast & Furious: Supercharged

 The Wizarding World of Harry Potter - London/Diagon Alley
 Harry Potter and the Escape from Gringotts
 Hogwarts Express

World Expo
 Men in Black: Alien Attack

 Springfield, U.S.A. Home Of The Simpsons 
 The Simpsons Ride
 Kang & Kodos' Twirl 'n' Hurl

Hollywood
 The Bourne Spectacular

Universal's Islands of Adventure

Marvel Super Hero Island
 The Incredible Hulk Coaster
 The Amazing Adventures of Spider-Man
 Doctor Doom's Fearfall
 Storm Force Accelatron

Toon Lagoon
 Popeye & Bluto's Bilge-Rat Barges
 Dudley Do-Right's Ripsaw Falls

Seuss Landing
 Cara-Seuss-el
 The Cat in the Hat
 One Fish, Two Fish, Red Fish, Blue Fish
 The High in the Sky Seuss Trolley Train Ride

Lost Continent
 Poseidon's Fury

The Wizarding World of Harry Potter - Hogsmeade/Hogwarts
 Flight of the Hippogriff
 Harry Potter and the Forbidden Journey
 Hogwarts Express

Jurassic Park
 Jurassic Park River Adventure
 Jurassic World VelociCoaster

Skull Island
 Skull Island: Reign of Kong

Two attractions do not currently accept Express Pass:
 Hagrid's Magical Creatures Motorbike Adventure
 Pteranodon Flyers

Universal Studios Japan

 The Amazing Adventures of Spider-Man
 Backdraft
 Despicable Me Minion Mayhem
 Flight of the Hippogriff
 Harry Potter and the Forbidden Journey
 Hollywood Dream – The Ride (but not Backdrop)
 Jaws
 Mario Kart: Koopa's Challenge
 Jurassic Park: The Ride
 Sesame Street 4-D Movie Magic
 Shrek 4-D
 Space Fantasy – The Ride
 T2-3D: Battle Across Time
 Yoshi's Adventure

Universal Studios Singapore

 Accelerator
 Battlestar Galactica
 Canopy Flyer
 Dino-Soarin'
 Donkey Live
 Enchanted Airways
 Jurassic Park Rapids Adventure
 King Julien's Beach Party-Go-Round
 Lights! Camera! Action! Hosted by Steven Spielberg
 Pantages Hollywood Theatre
 Revenge of the Mummy
 Sesame Street Spaghetti Space Chase
 Shrek 4-D
 Transformers: The Ride 3D
 Treasure Hunters
 Waterworld: A Live Sea War Spectacular

See also
 Disney's Fastpass, the virtual queue system for the Disney parks
 Flash Pass, a virtual queue system for the Six Flags parks
 Fast Lane, the virtual queue system for Cedar Fair parks

References

External links
 Universal Orlando's Official Website

Universal Parks & Resorts
Islands of Adventure
Universal Studios Florida